Swartz Creek Community School District is a public school district in Genesee County in the U.S. state of Michigan and in the Genesee Intermediate School District. The School District serves the City of Swartz Creek, parts of Flint, Flint Charter Township, Gaines Township,  Clayton Township,  Argentine Township and Village of Lennon even over into Shiawassee County.

History
S.T. Crapo donated part of the Crapo Farm land $40,000 which the school district matched with a bond to build the Mary Crapo School, named in honor of former Michigan Governor Henry H. Crapo's wife, with construction begin in 1928 and opened in 1929. The building original held all grades including kindergarten. The first graduating class of 1930 had four students.

With consolidation of a number of one room schoolhouse districts, Mary Crapo had a western wing added. The current high school was built in 1958 followed by the middle school and most of the current elementary schools. In 1983, Center Stage community theater group made Mary Crapo its performance home.

On May 8, 2008, two bond millage were on the ballot, one for a new high school and technology upgrades. The second to build an auditorium at the new high school.

The Building and Site Fund levy was renewed at a 1.8 mills in May 2011. The school board agreed on June 9, 2011, to purchase the Cage Fieldhouse from Cage Management Group for additional sports practice space with the Cage Group to manage the facility. On June 23, 2011, the school board approved the design of the performing arts center. The center was funded via a qualified school construction bond, a part of the federal stimulus package, to be paid back via the existing Building and Site Fund millage. The center was official opened on September 5, 2013. The center was official opened on September 5, 2013. Center Stage held 100 plays at Mary Crapo by the time they left the school in 2013.

In June 2014, Swartz Creek and Clio School District agreed to share administrative staff. First, the two district agreed to share a finance director follow by sharing an executive director of personnel.

In early 2018, the school board voted to close Mary Crapo building at the end of the school year and move the Child Development Center and Swartz Creek Academy (alternative education) to a former doctor's office on Morrish Road and to the middle school, respectively. The move would cost less than the $625,000 needed to fix and upgrade Crapo.

In 2019 the high school upgraded, modernized, and expanded its athletic field complex.

In 2021 Multiple additions would be added to the community schools, middle school, and high school.

Buildings

High school
The Swartz Creek High School is a secondary school in Swartz Creek build in 1958. The school was initial build with a 900–1,000 students capacity. Immediately after opening, the district had plans to add two new wings.

Sports

At the Little Red School House No.2 back in the late 19th century, Swartz Creek Schools started its sports tradition starting with a championship girls baseball team followed by a winning boys baseball team. In the 1940s, the football team earned the county championship trophy awarded by the Flint Journal, which nicknamed the Swartz Creek Teams as the "Dragons", after which the yearbook was called the dragon. Swartz Creek belong to the County B League then joined the Flint Metro League upon its founding in 1968 until the 1976 when they joined the Big Nine Conference. The Cross Country squad had extraordinary success racking 15 Big Nine Conference championships, many Greater Flint Area Champions, Regional Champions, multiple state meet appearances with runners up in 1982 and State Championship in 1986. Given the even large schools in the Big 9 that were some times classified as AA making teams uncompetitive in league play, Swartz Creek returned to the Flint Metro League in 2006.

Notable alumni
 Erik Jones (Class of 2014) - NASCAR Cup Series driver

References

External links

Michigan Center for Geographic Information's Map of the Swartz Creek School District

School districts in Michigan
Education in Genesee County, Michigan
1947 establishments in Michigan
School districts established in 1947